Abebe Gessese (born 4 November 1953) is an Ethiopian former athlete. He competed in the men's long jump at the 1980 Summer Olympics.

References

External links
 

1953 births
Living people
Athletes (track and field) at the 1980 Summer Olympics
Ethiopian male long jumpers
Olympic athletes of Ethiopia
Place of birth missing (living people)
20th-century Ethiopian people
21st-century Ethiopian people